Judges who served on the Commonwealth Court of Conciliation and Arbitration are:

Notes
References

Commonwealth Court of Conciliation and Arbitration